Allan G. Hoisington (born November 18, 1933) is a former American football player. He played with the Buffalo Bills and Oakland Raiders. He played college football at Pasadena City College.

References

1933 births
Living people
American football ends
Pasadena City Lancers football players
Oakland Raiders players
Buffalo Bills players
Players of American football from Chicago
American Football League players